The 4th World Championships in Athletics, under the auspices of the International Association of Athletics Federations, were held in the Neckarstadium, Stuttgart, Germany between 13 and 22 August with the participation of 187 nations. Having originally being held every four years in 1983, 1987 and 1991 these championships began a two-year cycle between events.

Event
The 1993 World Championships was the final time the women's 3,000 m would be contested. At subsequent Championships the race was replaced by the longer 5000 m.

Men's results

Track
1987 | 1991 | 1993 | 1995 | 1997

Note: * Indicates athletes who ran in preliminary rounds.

Field
1987 | 1991 | 1993 | 1995 | 1997

1 Michael Stulce of the United States originally finished third, but was disqualified after testing positive for excess testosterone and mestanolone.

Women's results

Track
1987 |1991 |1993 |1995 |1997

Note: * Indicates athletes who ran in preliminary rounds.

Field
1987 |1991 |1993 |1995 |1997

Medal table

See also
1993 in athletics (track and field)

References
Notes

Sources
 IAAF 1993

 
World Athletics Championships
International athletics competitions hosted by Germany
Sports competitions in Stuttgart
World Championships In Athletics, 1993
World Championships
1990s in Baden-Württemberg
August 1993 sports events in Europe
20th century in Stuttgart